The Para-Ski XS is a Canadian powered parachute that was designed and produced by Para-Ski of Mascouche, Quebec. The aircraft was supplied as a completed aircraft or as component kits for amateur construction.

Design and development
The aircraft was designed to be an all-terrain vehicle, capable of operating cross-country on wheels, skis, floats and flying under a canopy. As such it incorporates some design features that are unusual on powered parachutes. It features a custom made Para-Ski parachute-style high-wing, two-seats-in-tandem accommodation, quadracycle landing gear and a single  Rotax 582 engine in pusher configuration. To allow land and water operations the propeller has a rudder behind it, in the manner of an airboat, for steering via a set of handlebars. For surface operations the parachute is stowed in a specially designed compartment under the rear seat and the handlebars steer the wheels or the float-fitted water rudders. In flight the XS is steered either by the rudders, by foot pedals that actuate the canopy brakes, creating roll and yaw, or by a combination of both.

The aircraft is made from welded aluminum with the axles made from steel. It includes a fairing to provide protection for the occupants and a shield to keep water and stones out of the propeller during land and water operations. The aircraft is capable of taking off from water, provided the wing can be laid out on the shoreline without getting wet.

In 1998 the XS design was altered to allow it to also optionally mount a hang glider-style wing, transforming it into an ultralight trike and allowing faster cruising speeds than the parachute wing permits.

Specifications (XS)

References

XS
1990s Canadian ultralight aircraft
Single-engined pusher aircraft
Powered parachutes